The Daily Wire is an American conservative news website and media company founded in 2015 by political commentator Ben Shapiro and film director Jeremy Boreing. The company is a major publisher on Facebook, and produces podcasts such as The Ben Shapiro Show. In June 2022, The Daily Wire launched DailyWire+, a video on demand platform featuring various Daily Wire content, including podcasts and video productions. The company has released multiple exclusive feature-length films and television series. The Daily Wire is based in Nashville, Tennessee.

Many Daily Wire stories repackage journalism from traditional news organizations while adding a conservative slant. Fact checkers have said that some stories shared by The Daily Wire are unverified, and that The Daily Wire sometimes misstates facts to advance a partisan view.

History

The Daily Wire was conceived by Ben Shapiro and Jeremy Boreing, who both worked for TruthRevolt, a news website that was formerly funded by the David Horowitz Freedom Center. After the duo secured several million dollars in seed funding from billionaire petroleum industry brothers Dan and Farris Wilks, The Daily Wire was launched in 2015. Farris manages Bentkey Ventures, LLC (formerly Forward Publishing, LLC), which publishes The Daily Wire. Initially, the company was headquartered in Los Angeles, California and supported mostly by advertisements. In September 2020, Shapiro announced that The Daily Wire headquarters would move to Nashville, Tennessee.

The Daily Wire became one of the leading news sites and publishers on Facebook in terms of engagement. In 2018, NewsWhip identified The Daily Wire as "by far" the top right-wing publisher on Facebook. According to NewsWhip, The Daily Wire was the sixth-leading English-language publisher on Facebook in 2019 through the month of March. The site also had the second most articles among Facebook's 10,000 top stories. In 2021, stories published by The Daily Wire received more likes, shares and comments on Facebook than any other news publisher, according to NPR.

In April 2019, Podtrac ranked The Daily Wire's The Ben Shapiro Show the second most listened-to podcast in the U.S. for the month of March 2019, behind The Daily.

In June 2020, Shapiro stepped down from his role as editor-in-chief, which he had held since the site's founding, and took on the role of editor emeritus. John Bickley was announced as the site's next editor-in-chief.

In January 2021, Shapiro announced that The Daily Wire was beginning a studio for TV and films that would not promote "leftist causes". Its first original movie, Shut In, premiered in 2022.

In September 2021, Shapiro and Boreing announced that The Daily Wire would defy U.S. President Joe Biden's COVID-19 vaccine mandate for companies with more than 100 employees. The company later filed a lawsuit, which was eventually brought before the Supreme Court. The Supreme Court declared the mandates unlawful with a 6-3 ruling.

In October 2021, The Daily Wire hired Allison Williams, who had resigned from ESPN because the company mandated that live-event staffers get the vaccine and she had decided against being vaccinated while trying to conceive another child. The Daily Wire advertised the hire as "sports without the woke", with a banner that said "did not comply". Williams said she would explore issues "that may be too taboo for other media outlets".

In 2021, The Daily Wire announced a new publishing imprint, DW Books, that would release books by Shapiro, Candace Owens, Gina Carano, and an officer who fired shots in the police killing of Breonna Taylor, among others. According to AP News, this "continues a trend of conservatives setting up channels outside of the New York [publishing] houses", after publishing houses canceled several books seen as promoting extremist views, or refused distribution when other imprints picked them up. DW Books planned to release books through Ingram Content Group starting in 2022.

The Daily Wire's annual revenues exceeded $100 million for the first time as of early 2022, and it had 150 employees. In March 2022, The Daily Wire announced plans to invest at least $100 million into children's entertainment content over a three year period in response to Disney's opposition to Florida's House Bill 1557.

In June 2022, founder Jeremy Boreing said The Daily Wire had 890,000 paid subscribers. In November 2022, Boreing stated that they have surpassed 1,000,000 subscribers.

Dispute with Steven Crowder

In January 2023, conservative commentator Steven Crowder revealed on his Youtube channel that he had received a term sheet from an unnamed conservative media company (later revealed to be The Daily Wire) that included a provision that, if he were to be demonetized or removed from platforms such as YouTube, Facebook or the iTunes Store, his salary would be cut substantially during that period. Crowder took immense issue with that provision, saying that it enforces policies that disproportionately target conservatives and claiming "Big Tech is in bed with Big Con."  

CEO Jeremy Boreing later responded to Crowder's video, claiming that Crowder had misrepresented the terms of the contract and that the contract would have paid Crowder $50 million over four years. Furthermore, Boreing asserted that the stipulation was necessary to ensure profitability. Other Daily Wire pundits such as Ben Shapiro, Matt Walsh, and Candace Owens also criticized Crowder for his actions, including secretly recording a phone call he had with Boreing and only releasing parts of the call selectively, including a quote from Boreing saying that up-and-coming conservative commentators need to be “wage slaves for a little bit” while they build their brand.

Podcasts and radio
In addition to its written content, the site produces several podcasts, including The Ben Shapiro Show, The Michael Knowles Show, The Matt Walsh Show, and The Andrew Klavan Show.

The reach of The Ben Shapiro Show expanded in April 2018 when Westwood One began syndicating the podcast to radio. In January 2019, Westwood One expanded Shapiro's one-hour podcast-to-radio program, adding a nationally syndicated two-hour live radio show, for three hours of Ben Shapiro programming daily. , according to Westwood One, The Ben Shapiro Show is being carried by more than 200 stations, including in nine of the top ten markets.

In 2020, The Daily Wire acquired the entirety of PragerU's content.

On election day 2020, activist and former Turning Point USA communications director Candace Owens announced that she would move to Nashville, Tennessee, and join The Daily Wire with her own show, Candace. It premiered March 19, 2021. Its episodes air weekly and are filmed before a live studio audience. Notable guests include former president Donald Trump, UFC president Dana White, and U.S. Congressman Jim Jordan.

In March 2022, they started a new podcast called The Comments Section with Brett Cooper.

In 2022 DailyWire+ started airing The Jordan B. Peterson Podcast.

Documentaries
The Daily Wire has created several documentaries, including the Matt Walsh documentary What is a Woman?, released on June 1, 2022.

Entertainment 
In January 2021, The Daily Wire released Run Hide Fight, a feature-length drama about a mass school shooting. Its North American release was exclusive to Daily Wire subscribers. In November, The Daily Wire launched Adam Carolla Truth Yeller, a comedy podcast filmed with a live audience, featuring comedian Adam Carolla.

On February 10, 2022 The Daily Wire first original film, Shut In, premiered on YouTube. It was directed by D.J. Caruso and starred Rainey Qualley, Josh Horowitz, and Vincent Gallo in his first film since 2013. After acquiring domestic rights to The Hyperions, a superhero comedy starring Cary Elwes, the company premiered the film for free on YouTube on March 10, 2022. Afterward, it moved to The Daily Wire site for exclusive domestic on-demand viewing.

Terror on the Prairie, a western set in Montana and starring Gina Carano, was released to subscribers on June 14, 2022.

On June 29, 2022, The Daily Wire launched the video on demand platform DailyWire+ featuring various Daily Wire podcasts and video productions, and announced an animated preschool series titled Chip Chilla, which features the voice of comedian Rob Schneider. On November 3, My Dinner with Trump, a cinéma vérité-style documentary featuring Donald Trump with 16 of his closest advisors, released exclusively on the platform.

On November 17, 2022, The Daily Wire announced that it will produce adaptations of Ayn Rand's 1957 novel Atlas Shrugged and Stephen R. Lawhead's series The Pendragon Cycle.

Films

Television series

Products
In March 2022, co-CEO Jeremy Boreing opened a line of subscription-based shaving razors called Jeremy's Razors, openly competing against former Daily Wire sponsor Harry's Razors.

In March 2023, Jeremy Boreing started selling chocolate bars branded as Jeremy's Chocolate after Hershey's chocolate bars hired a transwoman to be their spokesman for International Women's Day.

Reception

Accuracy 
According to Snopes, "DailyWire.com has a tendency to share stories that are taken out of context or not verified", including an incorrect report on baby names in the Netherlands, a misdated, exaggerated story that protesters were digging up Confederate graves, a false allegation that Democratic congresspeople had refused to stand for a fallen Navy SEAL's widow, and a report that Harvard University was segregating commencement ceremonies (because black students had planned an optional event). The credibility checker NewsGuard assessed in 2021 that The Daily Wire "has sometimes misstated facts, including about COVID-19" but "generally maintains basic standards of credibility and transparency — with significant exceptions".

Various articles by The Daily Wire have engaged in climate change denial by making false or misleading claims when they dispute the scientific consensus on climate change. In 2017, when scientists writing in Climate Feedback described several Daily Wire articles as inaccurate or lacking evidence, The Daily Wire published corrections in two articles, after which the scientists assessed that the updated articles were still misleading. In November 2021, a study by the Center for Countering Digital Hate described The Daily Wire as being among "ten fringe publishers" that together were responsible for nearly 70 percent of Facebook user interactions with content that denied climate change. Facebook said the percentage was overstated and called the study misleading.

The "Coronavirus Misinformation Weekly Briefing" by academics of the Oxford Internet Institute described The Daily Wire's coverage of COVID-19 lockdowns and the World Health Organization as examples of "junk health news" narratives in 2020. Multiple scientific studies have identified The Daily Wire as a fake news website.

In April 2017, The Daily Wire incorrectly credited the Housing and Urban Development secretary, Ben Carson, with finding over $500 billion in accounting errors made by the Obama administration. FactCheck.org reported that the errors were discovered and published by HUD's independent inspector general before Carson became secretary.

Facebook criticism 
In October 2019, the investigative website Popular Information said that The Daily Wire had violated Facebook's policies by creating 14 anonymous pages promoting its content exclusively to boost engagement. In response, Facebook temporarily demoted a network called Mad World News, which had a financial relationship with The Daily Wire, but issued no penalty to The Daily Wire besides a warning.

In July 2021, an article by NPR in a series on disinformation accused The Daily Wire of having found success on Facebook by turning "anger into an art form and recycled content into a business model". It cited among its examples Daily Wire stories on COVID-19 vaccines that disproportionately played up potential side effects. Shapiro responded on Twitter by asserting that the NPR story reflected "the establishment media's deep desire to keep people from clicking on stories they want to read".

References

External links
 

2015 establishments in California
American companies established in 2015
Mass media companies established in 2015
American conservative websites
Conservative media in the United States
Internet properties established in 2015
American news websites
Podcasting companies
Companies based in Nashville, Tennessee
Climate change denial